XHAHC-FM is a radio station in Chihuahua City, Chihuahua, Mexico. Broadcasting on 90.9 FM, XHAHC is owned by Multimedios Radio and carries a grupera format known as La Caliente.

History
XHAHC received its concession on December 26, 1988. The original concessionaire was Enrigue Regules Uriegas, a Monterrey businessman connected to Grupo Multimedios. XHAHC was Multimedios's first radio station in Chihuahua.

References

1988 establishments in Mexico
Radio stations established in 1988
Mass media in Chihuahua City
Radio stations in Chihuahua
Radio stations in Mexico
Regional Mexican radio stations
Spanish-language radio stations
Multimedios Radio